The United States levies excise taxes on both legal and illegal gambling transactions.

IRS Form 730, Tax on Wagering, is used to compute excise taxes for both legal and illegal wagers of certain types. For state authorized wagers placed with bookmakers and lottery operators there is a tax of 0.25% of the wager, if it is legal. If the wager is not legal, the tax is 2% of the wager.

External links
United States Internal Revenue Service FAQ on the Federal Wagering Tax

Taxation in the United States
Excises